Events from the year 1858 in Scotland.

Incumbents

Law officers 
 Lord Advocate – James Moncreiff until March; then John Inglis until July; then Charles Baillie
 Solicitor General for Scotland – Edward Maitland; then Charles Baillie; then David Mure

Judiciary 
 Lord President of the Court of Session and Lord Justice General – Lord Colonsay
 Lord Justice Clerk – Lord Glencorse, then Lord Glenalmond

Events 
 1 January – the permanent North Unst Lighthouse on Muckle Flugga (Shetland), designed by brothers Thomas and David Stevenson, is first illuminated.
 16 April – the Wernerian Natural History Society of Edinburgh is wound up.
 31 August – Bressay Lighthouse in Shetland is first illuminated.
 26 October – launch of Fraserburgh life-boat, the first in Scotland under the auspices of the Royal National Lifeboat Institution.
 Completion of Hamilton Mausoleum.
 Reconstruction of Paisley Abbey begins.
 Temperate Palm House at Royal Botanic Garden Edinburgh built.
 The West of Scotland Grand National, predecessor of the Scottish Grand National, is first run, at a course near Houston, Renfrewshire.

Births 
 14 March – George Henry, painter (died 1943)
 10 April – Arthur Melville, painter of Oriental subjects (died 1904)
 7 December – Ned Haig, butcher and rugby union player notable for founding the sport of rugby sevens (died 1939)

Deaths 
 15 February – John Gray, owner of Greyfriars Bobby
 19 February – Alexander Black, architect (born c.1790)
 24 February – Thomas Hamilton, architect (born 1784)
 10 June – Robert Brown, botanist and palaeobotanist (born 1773)
 20 June – James Jardine, hydraulic engineer (born 1776)
 16 September – John Macgregor, shipbuilder (born 1802)

The arts
 24 March – the Scottish National Gallery on The Mound in Edinburgh opens.
 August – German writer Theodor Fontane tours Scotland.
 E. B. Ramsay's Reminiscences of Scottish Life and Character is published.

See also 
 Timeline of Scottish history
 1858 in the United Kingdom

References 

 
Years of the 19th century in Scotland
Scotland
1850s in Scotland